Eurycles may refer to:

 Proiphys, a genus of herbaceous, perennial and bulbous plants,  Eurycles, in the family Amaryllidaceae

 Caius Iulius Eurycles, a.k.a. Eurycles of Sparta, "Λακεδαιμονίων ηγεμόνα" (ruler of Spartans), a benefactor of Greek cities, and founder of the family of the Euryclids (1st century BCE)